Dzhibakhni (Kaitag: Чӏибахӏне; Dargwa: ЧIибяхIни) is a rural locality (a selo) and the administrative centre of Dzhibakhninsky Selsoviet, Kaytagsky District, Republic of Dagestan, Russia. The population was 1,198 as of 2010. There are 20 streets.

Geography 
Dzhibakhni is located 19 km southeast of Madzhalis (the district's administrative centre) by road. Ruka and Dzhavgat are the nearest rural localities.

Nationalities 
Dargins live there.

References 

Rural localities in Kaytagsky District